The Fourth Merkel cabinet (German: Kabinett Merkel IV) was the 23rd Government of the Federal Republic of Germany during the 19th legislative session of the Bundestag. It was sworn in on 14 March 2018 following the 2017 federal election and dismissed on 26 October 2021, acting in a caretaker mode until 8 December 2021. It was preceded by the third Merkel cabinet and succeeded by the Scholz cabinet. Led by Chancellor Angela Merkel, it was the third cabinet under Merkel to be supported by a coalition of the Christian Democratic Union (CDU), the Christian Social Union of Bavaria (CSU), and the Social Democratic Party (SPD).

Composition
The cabinet consists of Chancellor Angela Merkel and fifteen (fourteen since 20 May 2021) federal ministers. Olaf Scholz (SPD) replaced Sigmar Gabriel as Vice Chancellor and CSU Leader Horst Seehofer became Federal Minister of the Interior, Building and Community. Fourteen ministers head a department (since 20 May 2021, one minister heads two departments); one member of the cabinet, the Head of the Chancellery, is Federal Minister for Special Affairs without a portfolio. The CDU has seven positions, the SPD has six and the CSU has three, as follows:

2018 government crisis

In June 2018, a government crisis erupted within the cabinet between Interior Minister and CSU Chairman Horst Seehofer and Chancellor Angela Merkel, after Seehofer had elaborated a masterplan on asylum policies, containing the rejection of asylum seekers already registered in other EU countries. Seehofer had threatened to resign over the crisis on 1 July, but an agreement was made between the CDU/CSU sister parties on 2 July.

Caretaker government 
The results of the 2017 election had necessitated a series of negotiations that required the Merkel III cabinet to remain in a caretaker capacity for a prolonged period of time (into 2018). Government formation after the 2021 elections lasted until 24 November 2021, and the caretaker government continued until December 8, making Merkel just 9 days short of the record for longest-serving Chancellor in post-war German history ahead of Helmut Kohl.

References

External links
 Cabinet of Germany  (English)
 Federal Ministries of Germany (English)

2018 establishments in Germany
Angela Merkel
Merkel IV
Merkel IV
Merkel IV
Grand coalition governments